The canton of Oyonnax is an administrative division of the Ain department, in eastern France. It was created at the French canton reorganisation which came into effect in March 2015. Its seat is in Oyonnax.

Composition

It consists of the following communes:
Arbent
Oyonnax

Councillors

Pictures of the canton

References

Cantons of Ain